Karl Gottlieb Grell (28 December 1912, Burg an der Wupper – 4 October 1994) was a German zoologist and protistologist, famous for his work on Trichoplax.

Karl Grell received in 1934 his doctorate (Promotion) from the University of Bonn, where he wrote his dissertation on the digestive tract of the common scorpionfly  (Panorpa communis). Subsequently, he worked primarily on unicellular eukaryotes and the metazoan Placozoa. During WW II, he was assigned to an anti-malarial unit in southeast Europe.

At the University of Tübingen, Grell was a professor of zoology, teaching protozoology and genetics. He led excursions to study marine protozoa.

Grell published in 1956 the first edition of his textbook Protozoologie, which was followed by a German language 2nd edition in 1968 and a 3rd edition (1st English edition) in 1973. From 1959 to 1983 he was a co-editor for the Archiv for Protistenkunde. In addition to his work on Trichoplax, he was known for his research on life cycles of the Foraminifera.

He was an Honorary President of the IX International Congress of Protozoology in Berlin in 1993.

References

External links
 

University of Bonn alumni
Academic staff of the University of Tübingen
Max Planck Society people
20th-century German zoologists
Protistologists
1912 births
1994 deaths